Bully (released in the PAL region as Canis Canem Edit; Latin for "dog eat dog") is an action-adventure video game developed by Rockstar Vancouver and published by Rockstar Games. It was released on 17 October 2006 for the PlayStation 2. A remastered version of the game, subtitled Scholarship Edition, was developed by Mad Doc Software and released on 4 March 2008 for Xbox 360 and Wii, and on 21 October 2008 for Windows. Bully was re-released for PlayStation 4 available via PlayStation Network on 22 March 2016. An updated version of the Scholarship Edition, titled Anniversary Edition, was developed by War Drum Studios and released for Android and iOS on 8 December 2016.

The game is played from a third-person perspective and its open world can be navigated on foot, skateboard, motor scooter, bicycle, or go-kart. Set in the fictional town of Bullworth, the single-player story follows juvenile delinquent student James "Jimmy" Hopkins, who is involuntarily enrolled at Bullworth Academy boarding school for a year, and puts his efforts to rise through the ranks of the school system in order to put a stop to bullying. Players control Jimmy as he attempts to become more popular among the school's various "cliques", in addition to attending classes and completing various side missions. The Scholarship Edition includes a two-player competitive multiplayer mode that lets two players compete for the highest score in different classes.

Its expected violence and sexual content were initially controversial. Bully received positive reviews, with praise directed at the game's missions, narrative, and character development, though its presentation and glitches received criticism. The original version of Bully sold over 1.5 million copies and received multiple year-end accolades.

Gameplay 

Bully is an action-adventure game set in an open world environment and played from a third-person perspective. The game's single-player mode has the player control a high school student—teenage rebel, James "Jimmy" Hopkins. Throughout the story, Jimmy progresses through 6 chapters and through the ranks of the school groups, archetypes include Bullies, Nerds, Preppies, Greasers, Jocks and Townies. Players complete missions—linear scenarios with set objectives—to progress through the story. Missions reward the player with cash, new items, and increase/decrease the respect of certain groups. If a group holds Jimmy in high regard, they will act friendly towards him (and have the option of being hired as "bodyguards" or "muscle"); if a group despises Jimmy, they will attack him on sight. Outside of missions, the player can freely roam the game's open world, consisting of the fictional town of Bullworth, and has the ability to complete optional side missions.

When not performing missions, the player can attend classes, presented as minigames. Each course has five classes, which increase in difficulty, and passing all five will result in the player passing the course. Classes reward the player with new clothing items or abilities; for example, English allows the player to apologise to authority figures after violating rules, Chemistry allows players to create their own throwable weapons, Geography highlights special collectibles on the game's map, and Gym unlocks new fighting moves. Not attending classes when they are available is considered a violation of rules, unless they have been completed, in which case they become optional.

The player can use melee attacks and weapons to fight enemies. The weapons available include slingshots, bags of marbles and itching powder, stink bombs, firecrackers (including bottle rockets), baseball bats, planks of wood, and spud guns. Jimmy can run, jump, swim, climb or use vehicles to navigate the game's world. The vehicles featured in the game include a skateboard, scooters, bicycles, and go-karts. The player can also grab onto the back of a moving car while on a skateboard, but can't drive cars themselves. Bus stops located in various locations around the world allow the player to quickly travel back to Bullworth Academy. Should the player take damage, their health meter can be fully regenerated using multiple techniques, such as drinking sodas, which can be obtained from vending machines or dropped by enemies, and kissing certain NPCs after interacting with them. When the player's health is entirely depleted, gameplay stops and the player respawns at the nearest medical center.

If the player breaks rules while playing, the game's authority figures (prefects, policemen and orderlies) may respond as indicated by a "trouble" meter in the head-up display (HUD). The levels displayed on the meter indicate the current level of severity. Authority figures will attempt to grab and subdue the player, who may fight back. The higher the severity level is, the harder will authority figures try to catch the player; at the maximum level, the player can no longer fight back, as they will be instantly "busted" should they be grabbed. If the player is busted, they respawn at the nearest police station or the school principal's office and all their weapons (sans the slingshot, skateboard, and camera) are confiscated. If a class is in progress, the player will instead be taken to it and forced to attend (even if they have already completed it). Authority figures can subdue other students as well, should they cause trouble.

The game's multiplayer mode, exclusive to Scholarship Edition on Wii and Xbox 360 and Anniversary Edition, has two players compete to gain the highest score in the same minigames used for classes. One player controls Jimmy, and the other Gary Smith.

Synopsis

Setting 

Bully takes place in the fictitious town of Bullworth situated in the New England region of the United States. After being expelled from seven previous schools, the game's protagonist, 15-year-old James "Jimmy" Hopkins, is sent to the town's prominent private boarding school, Bullworth Academy, for a year while his mother and her new husband go on their honeymoon. The school campus is designed in a neo-gothic style, similar to public schools and colleges in the United Kingdom and New England, such as Fettes College in Edinburgh. The school itself is the game's primary setting, while the rest of the town is gradually unlocked as the story progresses.

Bullworth consists of four main districts: Bullworth Town, the town's commercial borough; Old Bullworth Vale, a suburb area where the town's mansions, beach, and funfair are located; New Coventry, a run-down, urban-poor borough, consisting mainly of tenement housing; and Blue Skies Industrial Park, an industrial borough consisting of factories, industrial buildings, the town docks, and a trailer park. There is also the Happy Volts Asylum, a psychiatric institute located between the Blue Skies Industrial Park and the Bullworth Academy.

Because the game's story spans an entire school year, Bullworth's appearance and colour changes as the seasons change between chapters, most notably during the third chapter, which takes place around the Christmas season.

Plot 
After being dropped off at Bullworth Academy, Jimmy Hopkins (Gerry Rosenthal) meets the school's principal, Dr. Ralph Crabblesnitch (Ralph Gunderman), who urges him to "keep his nose clean". He soon befriends senior Gary Smith (Peter Vack) and freshman Peter "Petey" Kowalski (Matt Bush), and begins working with them to try and assert their dominance over Bullworth's various "cliques": the Bullies, Nerds, Preppies, Greasers, Jocks and Townies. However, an increasingly paranoid Gary eventually betrays Jimmy and pits him against Russell Northrop (Cody Melton), the Bullies' leader, in an underground fight. Jimmy defeats Russell and forces him to stop picking on his fellow students, earning the Bullies' respect.

Over the following months, Jimmy works with Petey to take over the other cliques in an attempt to restore peace to Bullworth. He begins with the Preppies, but just as he begins to win them over, Gary manipulates them into turning against him. In response, Jimmy enters a boxing tournament hosted by the Preppies' leader, Derby Harrington (John Lavelle). Despite his victory, the Preppies refuse to accept Jimmy's dominance and fight him together, but are defeated. Turning his attention to the Greasers, Jimmy agrees to help their leader, Johnny Vincent (Rocco Rosanio), expose an affair between his girlfriend Lola Lombardi (Phoebe Strole) and Preppy member Gord Vendome (Drew Gehling). However, the Greasers turn on Jimmy after he is forced to make amends with the Preppies by vandalizing the Greasers' territory. After Gary tips Johnny off on Jimmy's growing closeness with Lola, he lures Jimmy into an ambush, but is ultimately defeated and surrenders Greaser leadership to him.

To take over the Jocks, regarded as the most powerful clique, Jimmy seeks the assistance of their main rivals, the Nerds. When they refuse to help, Jimmy defeats their leader, Earnest Jones (Jesse Tendler), and earns his and the Nerds' respect by guaranteeing they will never be picked on again. To ruin the Jocks' reputation, Earnest has Jimmy take inappropriate pictures of the school's head cheerleader, Mandy Wiles (Elena Franklin), which are then spread across town. However, Jimmy later removes the pictures out of pity for Mandy, earning her affection. Eventually, the Jocks are humiliated after Jimmy sabotages their big football game, and subsequently defeats their leader Ted Thompson (Alexander Cendese) in a fight in front of the entire school.

Having united all the cliques under his rule and restored peace to Bullworth, Jimmy basks in his newfound glory and respect, unaware that Gary is plotting to overthrow him. Gary convinces the clique leaders to pressure Jimmy into vandalizing Bullworth's town hall, and recruits the "Townies", a group of former Bullworth students who seek revenge against the school, to play a series of dangerous pranks on the cliques, so that they would blame Jimmy's poor leadership and turn on him. After informing Crabblesnitch of Jimmy vandalizing the town hall, Gary earns his respect and is appointed head boy, while Jimmy is expelled.

Although Jimmy initially accepts his defeat, Petey encourages him to seek revenge on Gary. To convince the Townies to turn on him, Jimmy seeks the assistance of one of their members, Zoe Taylor (Molly Fox), who was expelled from Bullworth after accusing the school's predatory sports teacher Mr. Burton (Michael Boyle) of sexual harassment. After helping Zoe exact revenge on Burton, Jimmy storms the Townies' hangout with her and Russell's help, and confronts their leader, Edgar Munsen (Jan Milewicz). After defeating Edgar, Jimmy explains to him how Gary manipulated and used both of them to his own ends, earning the Townies' respect.

Meanwhile, Gary and his followers take Crabblesnitch hostage, sparking a full-blown war between the cliques. The Townies and Russell help Jimmy neutralize the clique leaders, allowing him to confront Gary in the main school building. Jimmy chases Gary to the rooftop where they have a fight, which ends with both of them falling off the roof and into Crabblesnitch's office. Once freed, Crabblesnitch expels Gary, fires Burton for his actions against Zoe, appoints Petey as head boy, and reconciles with Jimmy by allowing both him and Zoe to return to Bullworth. Outside, while his friends, teachers, and allies cheer on, Jimmy shares a kiss with Zoe.

Development 
Rockstar announced Bully in May 2005 for the PlayStation 2 and Xbox with an original expected release date of October 2005. Early information released by Take-Two Interactive seemed to indicate that the player would be taking the role of a bully, and screenshots printed in Electronic Gaming Monthly showed the player-controlled antagonist administering a "swirlie" and throwing a punch at another student. However, the tone of the final game was different, with the player in the role of a problem student who stood up to and fought back against bullies, often bullying on behalf of the victims, or in self-defense.

The PlayStation 2 version of the game uses an advanced Grand Theft Auto: San Andreas engine through RenderWare. Rockstar Vancouver decided to make every student in the school have a unique appearance and personality.

When developing the characters, the team aimed at recreating the state of being a child, and making it enjoyable. Parallels were made between Jimmy and Catcher in the Ryes Holden Caulfield. Jimmy and Holden share a background of a difficult homelife and being thrown out of multiple private schools. Though the pompous school principal Dr. Crabblesnitch is originally introduced as the main antagonist, this role was later given to Gary Smith, a student who initially befriends Jimmy. Gary is described as a sociopath. He admits that he has attention-deficit disorder and is a narcissist, as he considers himself smarter and better than everyone, and wants to run the school.

Scholarship Edition 
On 19 July 2007, Rockstar announced that a remaster would be released for the Wii and Xbox 360, subtitled Scholarship Edition. Rockstar New England, then called Mad Doc Software, led development with the Xbox 360 version while Rockstar Toronto ported it to the Wii. The Wii and Xbox 360 versions were released on 4 March 2008. A Windows port was later developed by Rockstar New England and released on 21 October 2008. The game features additional content which is not in the original version, including missions, characters, school classes, and unlockable items and clothing. Some small script changes have been made, and the highly compressed voice files of the original have been replaced with higher-quality versions. The random non-player characters also have more lines. In addition, single system two-player competitive multiplayer minigames have also been added, along with Achievements for the Xbox 360 version and Wii Remote and Nunchuk motion and pointer controls for the Wii version. All ports of the Scholarship Edition use the game engine Gamebryo, rather than RenderWare, which was used for the original version.

Reception

Critical response 

Bully received "generally favorable" reviews from critics, according to review aggregator Metacritic.

Hypers Daniel Wilks commends the game for its "clever script, some novel missions, and well constructed characters". However, he criticised it for "time dilation, dodgy camera, and generic mini-games". Joystiq Bonnie Ruberg appreciated the casual nature in which the game allows Jimmy to kiss other boys; in 2013, Larry Hester of Complex ranked Jimmy among the "coolest" LGBT video game characters.

As of 12 March 2008, the PlayStation 2 version of Bully had sold 1.5 million copies according to Take-Two Interactive.

Remaster 

Bully: Scholarship Edition was released on 4 March 2008 for Wii and Xbox 360, and 21 October 2008 for Windows. According to Metacritic, the Wii and Xbox 360 versions received "generally favorable reviews", while the PC version received "mixed or average reviews". IGN gave the Wii version an 8/10, while the Xbox 360 version received 8.7/10. 1UP.com gave the Wii version an A− grade and the Xbox 360 version a B− grade. Gameplasma gave the Wii version a 9/10.  The PC version, however, received mixed reviews ranging from a "Good" rating of 7.8 from IGN to a C− from 1UP.com who called it "[a] shoddy, untimely port that, inexplicably – considering its ridiculously long port time – feels like a rush job." GameSpot later rated it with a "fair" rating of 6.0, calling it "[a] lazy porting job [which] hinders Bullys classic classroom hijinks".

The Xbox 360 version of Bully: Scholarship Edition was found to be unstable on some players' consoles, resulting in glitches, crashes, and performance issues. On 20 March, a patch was released, but there were reports claiming that the problems continued or worsened. When the Windows 10 version was released in July 2015, many users reported constant crashes and errors; many of these problems were addressed by an unofficial patch released by a fan.

Awards 
 Won GameSpot's award for Best Original Music.
 Finalist for GameSpot's Game of the Year 2006.
 Gaming Target – 52 Games We'll Still Be Playing From 2006 selection.
In 2010, the game was included as one of the games in the book 1001 Video Games You Must Play Before You Die.
Bully: Scholarship Edition was nominated for the Best Voice Acting award for an Xbox 360 game at IGN's Best of 2008 awards.
The PlayStation 2 version of Bully received a "Platinum" sales award from the Entertainment and Leisure Software Publishers Association (ELSPA), indicating sales of at least 300,000 copies in the United Kingdom.

Controversy 
Bullys title and gameplay was the subject of controversy among parents and educators who noted the adult content in previous Rockstar games, including the Grand Theft Auto: San Andreas Hot Coffee minigame controversy. Groups such as Bullying Online and Peaceaholics criticized the game for glorifying or trivializing school bullying, although they raised their objections before the game was released to the public. The player may also choose to kiss select girls and boys in the game, which the ESRB was aware of when rating the product. Classification boards generally restricted Bully to a teenage audience: the United States-based Entertainment Software Rating Board (ESRB) gave the game a T rating, the British Board of Film Classification gave it a 15 rating, the Australian Classification Board rated it M, and the New Zealand OFLC restricted it to people 13 years of age and over.

In 2007, Yahoo! Games listed it as one of the top ten most controversial games of all time.

Censorship 
Bully was banned in Brazil. In April 2008, a Brazilian judge prohibited the commerce and import of the game. The decision was based on findings by the state psychology society which stated that the game would be potentially harmful to teenagers and adults. On June 23, 2016, however, the game was officially rereleased in Brazil.

While British Labour MP Keith Vaz argued that Bully be banned or reclassified as rated 18 in the UK before its publication, the game was released rated 15. Currys and PC World, both owned by DSG International, said that they did not wish to sell the game in the UK because it is "not appropriate for Currys' family-friendly image". The statement lists what Currys believes is "the explicit link between violence and children" as the reason behind the ban. Despite this decision, other high street retailers including Game, HMV, and Virgin Megastores announced intentions to stock the game.

Prior to both the ESRB's rating and the release of Bully, Jack Thompson filed a lawsuit attempting to have the game banned from store shelves in Florida. Thompson declared the game a "nuisance" and "Columbine simulator". Thompson's petition, filed with the 11th Judicial Circuit Court, asked for Wal-Mart and Take-Two Interactive to furnish him with an advance copy of Bully so he could have "an independent third party" play the game and determine if it would constitute a public nuisance in the state of Florida, in which case it could be banned. Take-Two Interactive offered to bring in a copy and let both the judge and Thompson view the game in the judge's chambers on 12 October 2006. On 13 October 2006, Judge Ronald Friedman subsequently ruled in favor of shipping the game, noting that there was no content in the game that was not already on late night television. Thompson responded to the ruling with a fiery speech directed at the judge. When given a preview build, the mainstream American media took a generally positive view of the game. Press coverage described the game as free-form, focusing on building a social network and learning new skills from classes, with strictly enforced punishments for serious misbehaviour.

Cancelled sequel 
In November 2006, Michael Pachter, managing director of research for Wedbush Morgan Securities, predicted that Bully would not sell well enough over the upcoming holidays to warrant a sequel. However, when his prediction turned out to be untrue, Pachter apologized to Rockstar Games and Take-Two Interactive, calling the sequel a "possibility".

During the development of Bully: Scholarship Edition, Mad Doc Studios was acquired by Rockstar in April 2008 and renamed to Rockstar New England. As Rockstar New England, the studio finished off Bully: Scholarship Edition as well as assisted Rockstar's other studios in supporting the DLC content for Grand Theft Auto IV, and in support of Red Dead Redemption. Near the end of this period, Rockstar had greenlit early production on Bully 2 at Rockstar New England. Rockstar New England had created a vision for Bully 2 that aligned with Rockstar's larger direction in developing games with higher prestige, which had started with GTA IV, Red Dead Redemption and L.A. Noire, incorporating new narratives and technology to make it a more character-driven game. According to former Rockstar New England employees speaking to Game Informer, the entire studio of between 50 and 80 employees had been working on Bully 2 at one point, developing it as an open-world game with a map three times the size from the original Bully and approaching the size of the world in Grand Theft Auto: Vice City; while the map did not have the scale of GTA IV, the developers were planning several deep systems that would make the map feel bigger, such as having many more buildings that could be entered on the map. Rockstar New England also planned to incorporate more artificial intelligence in the game so that player choices would have more impact later in the game. Several other new technology systems were developed by the studio, which ended up in games such as Max Payne 3 and Red Dead Redemption 2.

By around 2009, Rockstar New England had developed a playable vertical slice of the game in place with working versions of these new systems which they presented to Rockstar as a project milestone. Former developers stated this had about six to eight hours of content, consistent with other Rockstar projects, and was about two to three years from a final version. Though Rockstar did not state anything directly, something had changed in the studio's attitude according to former developers, leading up to Rockstar laying off about 10% of Rockstar New England in June 2009, and in 2010 they started pulling staff working on Bully 2 onto supporting projects from other Rockstar studios, effectively cancelling further development on Bully 2.

Rumors and comments related to Bully 2 still persisted after this point. In November 2009, The Gaming Liberty interviewed musician Shawn Lee, who scored Bully, and was asked if he was scoring any more games in the near future; he responded, "Yes. It looks like I will be doing the soundtrack for Bully 2 in the not so distant future".

In November 2011, in an interview with Gamasutra, Rockstar executive Dan Houser revealed that the studio might focus on a sequel for Bully after the release of Max Payne 3. "Contrary to a lot of people, we like to take a little bit of time at the end of a game before starting a sequel, so we can wait for the excitement or disappointment and everything else of the experience to shake down and really see what we should do in the next game," he said. "So we knew that we didn't want to start doing the Bully sequel instantly at that second with Rockstar Vancouver even though it is a property that, like Max Payne, we adore and might come back to in the future. There was just no impetus to do that then. So we said, 'You can do Max Payne, and then we will see what we can do with Bully."

In July 2012, Rockstar Vancouver was merged into Rockstar Toronto, and the staff was offered to join a different Rockstar studio.

In September 2013, Dan Houser said he had many different ideas for a Bully sequel. To date, this is the last official comment on a Bully sequel.

On 28 August 2017, concept art rumoured to be from the development of a sequel leaked online; it purported to show new characters and a run-down suburban home along with a few other bits of art; Rockstar Games did not comment.
 
In July 2019, a Rockstar New England ex-employee revealed that Rockstar had worked on a sequel for several months before shutting it down in 2009. He claimed to have worked on various game mechanics in the scrapped project and stated that the story would have featured Jimmy living with his mother and step-siblings in his stepfather's mansion during summer vacation.

In October 2019, Video Games Chronicle published a story based on inside sources corroborating that Rockstar had indeed worked on Bully 2 for eighteen months before cancelling it. Production of the game however began in May 2010, shortly after Red Dead Redemption was released, and eventually was discontinued sometime before the end of 2013 as the project did not get much traction in the studio. During this time, a reported small slice of a working game was built using the Rockstar Advanced Game Engine (RAGE). According to these sources, the studio had worked out some of the story but were not sure what period of time it would cover. One source confirmed the ex-employee's claims that the story began with Jimmy spending summer vacation with his mother and stepfamily. Rockstar Games refused to comment on this topic.

Notes

References

External links 

 Official Bully homepage
 Official Canis Canem Edit homepage

2006 video games
Action-adventure games
Android (operating system) games
Beat 'em ups
Bullying in fiction
Cancelled Xbox games
Censored video games
Christmas video games
Gamebryo games
Grove Street Games games
High school-themed video games
IOS games
LGBT-related video games
Multiplayer and single-player video games
Obscenity controversies in video games
Open-world video games
PlayStation 2 games
RenderWare games
Rockstar Games games
School-themed video games
Stealth video games
Take-Two Interactive games
Video game controversies
Video games developed in Canada
Video games set in New England
Video games written by Dan Houser
Wii games
Windows games
Xbox 360 games